Maslovo is a rural locality (a settlement) in Frunzenskoye Rural Settlement, Sredneakhtubinsky District, Volgograd Oblast, Russia. The population was 461 as of 2010. There are 13 streets.

Geography 
Maslovo is located 17 km west of Srednyaya Akhtuba (the district's administrative centre) by road. Burkovsky is the nearest rural locality.

References 

Rural localities in Sredneakhtubinsky District